Riudaura, sometimes also spelled Riudaure, is a municipality in the comarca of Garrotxa in Girona, Catalonia, Spain.

The local river, riera de Riudaura, caused a flood further downstream in Olot town in 1940.

Villages
Bac d'en Déu, 26 
Clot de la Plana, 23 
El Solei, 84 
La Fajula, 15 
Riudaura, 258

References

External links 

Pàgina web oficial de l'Ajuntament
 Government data pages 

Municipalities in Garrotxa
Populated places in Garrotxa